The Fredericton Canadiens, or the 'Baby Habs' were a professional ice hockey team in Fredericton, New Brunswick. The Canadiens played their home games at the Aitken Centre. They were a member of the American Hockey League from 1990 to 1999, and were a farm team of the Montreal Canadiens.

The team was originally the Sherbrooke Canadiens before 1990, and subsequently moved to Quebec City as the Quebec Citadelles in 1999, then moving to Hamilton in 2002 to become the Hamilton Bulldogs.  

In 1995, the Canadiens played in the Calder Cup Finals, where they were swept in four games by the Albany River Rats.

Season-by-season results

Regular season

Playoffs

† Two game combined total goals series.

See also
List of ice hockey teams in New Brunswick

 
Ice hockey clubs established in 1990
Sports clubs disestablished in 1999
1990 establishments in New Brunswick
1999 disestablishments in New Brunswick
Montreal Canadiens minor league affiliates